The following is a list of Saturday Night Live writers. The show, created by Lorne Michaels, is an American live sketch comedy and variety show.  Airing since 1975, it has employed a large and changing staff of writers.

Season 1 (1975–76)

Season 2 (1976–77)

Season 3 (1977–78)

Season 4 (1978–79)

Season 5 (1979–80)

Season 6 (1980–81)

Season 7 (1981–82)

Season 8 (1982–83)

Season 9 (1983–84)

Season 10 (1984–85)

Season 11 (1985–86)

Season 12 (1986–87)

Season 13 (1987–88)

Season 14 (1988–89)

Season 15 (1989–90)

Season 16 (1990–91)

Season 17 (1991–92)

Season 18 (1992–93)

Season 19 (1993–94)

Season 20 (1994–95)

Season 21 (1995–96)

Season 22 (1996–97)

Season 23 (1997–98)

Season 24 (1998–99)

Season 25 (1999–2000)

Season 26 (2000–01)

Season 27 (2001–02)

Season 28 (2002–03)

Season 29 (2003–04)

Season 30 (2004–05)

Season 31 (2005–06)

Season 32 (2006–07)

Season 33 (2007–08)

Season 34 (2008–09)

Season 35 (2009–10)

Season 36 (2010–11)

Season 37 (2011–12)

Season 38 (2012–13)

Season 39 (2013–14)

Season 40 (2014–15)

Season 41 (2015–16)

Season 42 (2016–17)

Season 43 (2017–18)

Note: Beginning with the show's forty-third season, Weekend Update writers were credited separately from the rest of the writing staff.

Season 44 (2018–19)

Season 45 (2019–20)

Season 46 (2020–21)

Season 47 (2021–22)

Season 48 (2022–23)

References

Bibliography
 

Saturday Night Live
Writers